Marino Giovanni Defendi (born 19 August 1985) is an Italian footballer who plays for Ternana as a midfielder. Despite starting his career as a second striker, Defendi also played as a winger, attacking midfielder and more recently as a central or defensive midfielder.

Club career
Defendi joined Bari in a three-year contract on 25 July 2011, as part of Andrea Masiello's deal.

In August 2016, Defendi joined Serie B side Ternana in a three-year contract.

International career
Defender played for the Italy U20 side in the 2005 FIFA World Youth Championship, and for the Italy U21 side in the 2006 UEFA European Under-21 Football Championship.

Honours
Atalanta
Serie B: 2005–06

References

External links
Atalanta B.C. Official Player Profile 
Marino Defendi National Team Stats at FIGC.it 

1985 births
Living people
Association football midfielders
Italian footballers
Atalanta B.C. players
A.C. ChievoVerona players
U.S. Lecce players
F.C. Grosseto S.S.D. players
S.S.C. Bari players
Ternana Calcio players
Serie A players
Serie B players
Footballers from Bergamo
Italy under-21 international footballers
Italy youth international footballers